Hawaii Territory's at-large congressional district was the congressional district for the Territory of Hawaii, which was established by the Newlands Resolution of 1898.

On April 30, 1900, the Hawaiian Organic Act gave the Territory the authority to elect a single non-voting congressional delegate.

After Hawaii's admission to the Union as the 50th state by act of Congress on August 21, 1959, this district was replaced by Hawaii's at-large congressional district.

List of delegates representing the district

References

Sources 
 

Former congressional districts of the United States
At-large United States congressional districts
Territory At-large
Congress
1900 establishments in Hawaii
1959 disestablishments in Hawaii
Constituencies established in 1900
Constituencies disestablished in 1959